St Osmund's Church is a Roman Catholic church in Salisbury, Wiltshire, England. It was built from 1847 to 1848 and designed by Augustus Pugin in the Gothic Revival style. It is located on Exeter Street next to Bishop Wordsworth's School in the city centre. It is a Grade II listed building.

History

Foundation
After the Reformation the Catholic community in Salisbury celebrated Mass in a house on Cathedral Close owned by Baron Arundell of Wardour. In the early 1800s, the Arundells left the area. In 1811, a former inn, the World's End Inn on St Martin's Lane, was bought so that a small chapel could be built there.

Construction
In the 1840s the chapel was too small to accommodate the increasing Catholic population of the city. John Lambert, the first Catholic mayor of Salisbury, bought the site of the current church and presbytery. He commissioned Augustus Pugin to design the church. In 1835, Pugin had converted to Catholicism in nearby Alderbury. On 8 April 1847, the foundation stone was laid by Bishop William Ullathorne the Vicar Apostolic of the Western District. On 6 September 1848, the church was consecrated.

Developments
In 1850, stained glass by Hardman & Co. was installed in the church. In the 1890s, the church was extended by Edward Doran Webb. In the 1980s, the walls in the chancel were repainted according to the original Pugin design. In 1982, stained glass was installed. They show the England and Welsh martyrs.

Parish
St Osmund's Church is in the same parish as Holy Redeemer Church near the Bishopdown area of Salisbury and is in partnership with the parish of  St Gregory and the English Martyrs Church on St Gregory's Avenue to the west of Salisbury. St Osmund's Church has four Sunday Masses at 9:00am, 11:00am, and 18:00am, with an Ordinariate Mass at 12:15pm. Holy Redeemer Church has a Sunday Mass at 18:00pm on Saturday and St Gregory's Church has a Sunday Mass at 9:00am.

See also
 Diocese of Clifton

References

External links

 

Osmund
Salisbury, Saint Osmund
Salisbury, Saint Osmund
Grade II listed Roman Catholic churches in England
Augustus Pugin buildings
Gothic Revival church buildings in England
Salisbury, Saint Osmund
1847 establishments in England
Roman Catholic churches completed in 1848
19th-century Roman Catholic church buildings in the United Kingdom